Wenzel Müller (26 September 1767 – 3 August 1835) was an Austrian composer and conductor. Other than Rossini, Verdi, or Puccini, he is regarded as the most prolific opera composer of all time with his 166 operas.

Life and career 
Müller was born in Markt Türnau, in Moravia. He studied with Carl Ditters von Dittersdorf and performed as a theatre musician in his youth. In 1786 he became Kapellmeister at the Theater in der Leopoldstadt in Leopoldstadt, Vienna. After several years at the German theatre in Prague from 1807 until 1813, he returned to Leopoldstadt, where he worked until 1830. Under his leadership, the theatre became one of the most important venues in Viennese musical life. He died in Baden bei Wien.

He was a popular and prolific composer, producing more than 250 works. Although he wrote several popular stage works (mostly Singspiele), his art songs are his enduring legacy. Often possessing witty music and lyrics or expressing a great deal of tenderness, Müller's songs were immensely popular and some of the works he wrote with Ferdinand Raimund remain in the Viennese repertory. His opera  provided the theme for Beethoven's "Kakadu Variations" for piano trio, Opus 121a. He is said to have composed what has been falsely known as Mozart's Twelfth Mass, K. Anh. 232, the Missa in G major K. Anh. 232 (C1.04).

Müller was married twice, and his second wife was Magdalena Valley Reining. He had children named Therese (1791–1876), Caroline (1814–1868), Ottilia (1816–1817), Carl (born 1815) and Joseph (born 1816), all of whom became opera singers. On 3 August 1835, Müller died of natural causes in Baden bei Wien, Austria, at the age of 67.

Stage works

References

Sources 
Peter Branscombe. "Müller, Wenzel."  The New Grove Dictionary of Opera, edited by Stanley Sadie (1992),  and

External links 
Short biography at aieou 
Selected works

1767 births
1835 deaths
People from Svitavy District
Moravian-German people
Austrian classical composers
Austrian people of German Bohemian descent
Austrian opera composers
Male opera composers
People from Leopoldstadt
Austrian male classical composers